Hon. William Owen Stanley (13 November 1802 – 24 February 1884) was a British Liberal Party politician.

Life
Stanley was the son of John Stanley, 1st Baron Stanley of Alderley, and Lady Maria Josepha, daughter of John Holroyd, 1st Earl of Sheffield. His elder twin brother was Edward Stanley, 2nd Baron Stanley of Alderley. He became a solicitor. Stanley married Ellin Williams, daughter of Sir John Williams of Bodelwyddan, Flintshire in 1832. He was heir to Penrhos estate in Anglesey where he lived throughout his life.

Stanley was a member of parliament (MP) for Anglesey 1837–1847, City of Chester 1850–1857 and Beaumaris 1857–1874. He was also the Lord Lieutenant of Anglesey 2 March 1869 – 24 February 1884, Stanley was a captain and adjutant in the Grenadier Guards. As an antiquarian of wide reputation, he was the author of Anglesey (1871) and contributed many Celtic contributions, especially on Celtic subjects and his excavations at Holyhead and Castell, Anglesey, to Archaeologia Cambrensis. In 1855 he oversaw the building of Holyhead Market Hall, which stands today, albeit as a library and offices.

Stanley donated a collection of antiquities from Anglesey to the British Museum in 1870 and 1881. His monument is in St Cybi's Church, Holyhead.

References

External links
 
 

1802 births
1884 deaths
Whig (British political party) MPs for English constituencies
Liberal Party (UK) MPs for Welsh constituencies
UK MPs 1837–1841
UK MPs 1841–1847
UK MPs 1847–1852
UK MPs 1852–1857
UK MPs 1857–1859
UK MPs 1859–1865
UK MPs 1865–1868
UK MPs 1868–1874
Grenadier Guards officers
Members of the Cambrian Archaeological Association
Younger sons of barons
British twins
Members of the Parliament of the United Kingdom for Beaumaris
Whig (British political party) MPs for Welsh constituencies